Inspector Garud is a 2007 Indian Malayalam-language action drama film directed by Johny Antony, starring Dileep and Kavya Madhavan as the lead roles. The film was a commercial success at the box office.

Synopsis

Inspector Garud has Circle Inspector Madhavan Kutty as a very corrupt officer, known as Garud as he is fast as a falcon who would do any dirty work for money. He became Inspector not through the right channel but by paying  as bribe. So he is now bound on getting his money back through bribes.

A consignment of arms reaches Kochi meant for LTTE and the villain, Karaikkudy Arumuga Palaniyappa Chettiyar is keeping it in a colony run by him. An honest cop Rajan Joseph discovers the plot but is sacked by the Home minister. Garud saves Chettiyar and at the same time rips him off. Meanwhile, Madhavan Kutty is humiliated by the new Sub Collector Sethulakshmi who makes him apologize to her in front of the Women's Commission. He takes revenge by working out a marriage with Sethulakshmi under pressure leading to further complications.

Cast

Music

Inspector Garud has music given by Alex Paul. The lyrics were written by Vayalar Sarath Chandra Varma. The film has six songs. The playback singers are Jyotsna, Franko, Vineeth Sreenivasan, Rimi Tomy, Afsal, Reju Joseph, Pradeep Babu and Dileep himself. Afsal sings the song "Kanthari Penne".

References

External links

2000s Malayalam-language films
2007 romantic comedy films
2007 films
Films directed by Johny Antony
Films shot in Kochi
Fictional portrayals of the Kerala Police
Films about organised crime in India
Films about police officers
Indian romantic comedy films
Films scored by Alex Paul